Rumman Chowdhury was born in 1980 in Rockland County, New York. She is a Bengali American data scientist, a business founder, and former Responsible Artificial Intelligence Lead at Accenture. She enjoyed watching science fiction and attributes her curiosity about science to the Dana Scully effect. She completed her undergraduate study in Management Science and Political Science at Massachusetts Institute of Technology. She received a Master's of Science from Columbia University in Statistics and Quantitative methods. She holds a Doctorate Degree in Political Science from University of California, San Diego. She finished her PhD whilst working in Silicon Valley. Her main interest and focus for her career and higher educational studies was how data can be used to understand people's bias and ways to evaluate the impact of technology on humanity From February 2021 to November 2022, she served as Director of Engineering of Twitter's Machine Learning Ethics, Transparency, and Accountability (META) team, working to make Twitter's AI algorithm more in line with ethical guidelines.

Career

Early 
Chowdhury taught data science at the boot camp Metis and worked at Quotient before joining Accenture in 2017. She leads their work on responsible artificial intelligence. She is concerned about the AI workforce; particularly on retaining researchers. She is also concerned about algorithmic bias. She has spoken openly about the need to define what ethical AI actually means. She works with companies on developing ethical governance and algorithms that explain their decisions transparently. She is determined to use AI to improve diversity in recruitment.

Chowdhury, alongside a team of early career researchers at the Alan Turing Institute, developed a Fairness Tool which scrutinises the data that is input to an algorithm and identifies whether certain genders (such as race or gender) may influence the outcome. The tool both identifies and tries to fix bias, enabling organisations to make more fair decisions.

All.ai, Parity and X Institute 
Chowdhury designed All.ai, a language analysis tool that can monitor and improve the gender balance of speakers in meetings.

In 2020 she founded Parity to bridge the translation gap between risk, legal, and data teams.

She launched X Institute, a program which teaches refugees about data science and marketing.

She has given a keynote at Slush, talking about augmenting human capabilities. She delivered a TED talk about humanity in the age of artificial intelligence.

Twitter 
From February 2021 till November 2022 Chowdhury was a director for the Machine Learning Ethics, Transparency and Accountability (META) team with Twitter. META’s goal was to study and improve the ML systems used within Twitter, this includes biased algorithms that may cause harm to the user. Biased algorithms have been an issue since artificial intelligence (AI) has been introduced to the world; traits such as gender, sex, race, or social class hold potential segregation that may result in unfair decisions, META strives avoid this by making Twitter better, fair, accountable, and more transparent for its users. Most projects that META teams do involve research and data analysis, which is why the team is made from Researchers and Engineers. AI is constantly changing and becoming greater, so the META teams have a similar process where they are learning inside and outside of the app and applying that knowledge to build a better Twitter. Future changes that will impact Twitter will be having the algorithms used explainable to the users making the app more transparent, eventually leading to the users customizing or creating the algorithms by themselves. This means that the Twitter community will play an important role to making Twitter a stronger app. In 2021, Rumman Chowdhury's did an analysis Examining algorithmic amplification of political content on Twitter.

Awards 
In 2017 she was included in the 100 Women (BBC). In 2018 she was named as one of five people who are shaping AI by Forbes. She was acknowledged  by Biz journals as one of the Bay Area's top 40 Under 40 which aims to recognize people before the age of 40 who are leaders that demonstrate professional excellence in the bay area. Since then she has also been inducted into the British Royal Society of the Arts (RSA) to celebrate people who have made progress in social challenges.

References 

American people of Bangladeshi descent
1980 births
Women data scientists
Data scientists
Women political scientists
Massachusetts Institute of Technology alumni
Columbia University alumni
University of California, San Diego alumni
Living people
20th-century American women scientists
21st-century American women scientists
American political scientists
20th-century social scientists
21st-century social scientists
Artificial intelligence ethicists
BBC 100 Women